Ahmad Syamim Bin Yahya (born 17 May 1990) is a Malaysian professional footballer who plays as a winger for  Malaysia Super League club Sabah.

Early life
Syamim was born in district of Raub, Pahang, on 17 May 1990. He studied at Sekolah Teknik Bentong and has represented the school, district and state in football competitions. After finishing high school, he attended a course at Institut Kemahiran Mara in Kampung Pandan. At the same time, he also played in Raub district league.

Club career

Johor
In 2012, at the age of 22, Syamim participated in the selection of the Johor and successfully made it through the selection and be part of Johor team. That was how his career as a professional footballer began. He played a year for Johor FA before the team merged with Johor FC to reform as JDT. He was released, and Peter Butler signed him up for T team before the 2013 campaign began. A year later he joined Felda where Irfan Bakti managed to dig the best out of him.

Felda United
In January 2014, Syamim signed with Jengka based club, Felda United playing in Malaysian second tier league, Malaysia Premier League. He spent 3 seasons with Felda United before leaving to Pahang in January 2017. While playing for the team, he was injured and spent a lot of time off the field.

Pahang
On 21 January 2017, during league campaign, Syamim scored one goal during his debut with Pahang playing against Perak in Ipoh. Syamim who joined Pahang FA this season, was a winger for Felda United in the last two seasons. He scored six goals in 2015 but only managed two in an injury-plagued season last year.

Returned to Felda
After a season with Pahang blighted by injury. Syamim re-signed with Felda for 2018 and the team became champions of the 2018 Malaysia Premier League

Terengganu F.C. 
After one amazing season winning the second-tier league with Felda United, Syamim decided to join Terengganu for the 2019 season.

Bad Boy attitude
Syamim was known for his style of play with tough tackler and dirty challenged. In 25 February 2017, he was fined RM 500 by the FAM after showing middle finger to somebody during match against Melaka United. Shamim later apologize over his action, he said that he just joking with his old-friend whom now play for Malacca and stated it's not about raged or anger.

Career statistics

Club

International

International career
In May 2015, Syamim has been selected to represent Malaysia XI in 2015 AIA Cup competition against English Premier League club, Tottenham Hotspur. The match took place on 27 May at the Shah Alam Stadium. Malaysia XI lost the match by a score of 2–1.

Honours

Clubs

Felda United
 Malaysia Premier League: Runner-up; 2014
 Malaysia Super League: Runner-up; 2016

References

External links
 
 

1990 births
Malaysian footballers
People from Pahang
Living people
Sri Pahang FC players
Felda United F.C. players
Terengganu F.C. II players
Johor Darul Ta'zim F.C. players
Malaysia Super League players
Malaysia international footballers
Association football midfielders